Minuscule 372 (in the Gregory-Aland numbering), ε 600 (Soden), is a Greek minuscule manuscript of the New Testament, on parchment. Palaeographically it has been assigned to the 16th century.
It is almost without a marginal equipment.

Description 

The codex contains the text of the four Gospels on 199 parchment leaves with one big lacunae (John 3:1-21:25). It is written in one column per page, in 30 lines per page. According to Scrivener it is beautifully written.

Text 

Hermann von Soden classified its to the Ia, which would make it "Western" or "Caesarean". Kurt Aland the Greek text of the codex did not place in any Category.

According to the Claremont Profile Method it represents mixed text in Luke 1, Luke 10, and Luke 20. Wisse stated that its text is very strange.

History 

Probably it was written in Italy, by Honoratus (?).
The manuscript was added to the list of New Testament manuscripts by Scholz (1794–1852).
C. R. Gregory saw it in 1886.

The manuscript is currently housed at the Vatican Library (Vat. gr. 1161) in Rome.

See also 

 List of New Testament minuscules
 Biblical manuscript
 Textual criticism

References

Further reading

External links 
 Minuscule 372 at the Encyclopedia of Textual Criticism

Greek New Testament minuscules
16th-century biblical manuscripts
Manuscripts of the Vatican Library